is the thirteenth single of the Japanese boy band Arashi. The single was released in three editions: a regular edition containing a bonus track and karaoke versions of all the songs released in the single, and two limited editions, both containing a DVD with a music video of one of the A-side tracks. The single is the group's third double A-side single, and all the songs included in the single starts with the letter "H".

Single Information
"Hitomi no Naka no Galaxy" was used as the theme song for the drama Minami-kun no Koibito starring Kyoko Fukada and Arashi member Kazunari Ninomiya, and "Hero" was used as the theme song for NTV's Olympics coverage.

Track list

Charts, peaks and certifications

Charts

Sales and certifications

References

External links
 Hitomi no Naka no Galaxy/Hero product information 
 Hitomi no Naka no Galaxy/Hero Oricon profile 

Arashi songs
2004 singles
Oricon Weekly number-one singles
Japanese television drama theme songs